Perihypoglossal nuclei (nuclei perihypoglossales), called also perihypoglossal complex or perihypoglossal nuclear complex or satellite nuclei is a group of neurons in the floor of the fourth ventricle, in close proximity to the nucleus of the hypoglossal nerve in the gray substance of the medulla oblongata, all of which contain cells with characteristics suggestive of reticular connections. 

The complex includes three nuclei: the intercalated nucleus, the nucleus prepositus, and the sublingual nucleus. The nucleus prepositus is the largest of the three.
 
Perihypoglossal nuclei receive afferents from the cerebral cortex,  vestibular nuclei,  accessory oculomotor nuclei, and  paramedian pontine reticular formation. Efferent fibers of these nuclei terminates in  cranial nerve nuclei involved in extraocular movement (oculomotor, trochlear, abducens),  the cerebellum, and  the thalamus. The perihypoglossal nuclei and their connections are part of a complex circuitry related to eye movements. Lesions in the nucleus prepositus impair the ability to keep the eyes fixed on a visual target, although conjugate movements are still performed accurately.

References 
John Alan Kiernan, Murray Llewellyn Barr. Barr's The Human Nervous System: An Anatomical Viewpoint. 2008

Neuroanatomy